Rodell Thomas (born August 2, 1958) is a former American football linebacker. He played for the Miami Dolphins in 1981 and from 1983 to 1984 and for the Seattle Seahawks from 1981 to 1982.

References

1958 births
Living people
American football linebackers
Alabama State Hornets football players
Miami Dolphins players
Seattle Seahawks players